Tyrone Greenidge (16 May 1965 – 19 November 1993) was a Barbadian cricketer. He played in one List A and five first-class matches for the Barbados cricket team in 1985/86 and 1986/87. He died of leukemia in 1993.

See also
 List of Barbadian representative cricketers

References

External links
 

1965 births
1993 deaths
Barbadian cricketers
Barbados cricketers
People from Saint James, Barbados
Deaths from leukemia
Deaths from cancer in Barbados